Walden is a book by Henry David Thoreau.

Walden may also refer to:

 Walden Pond, a body of water in Massachusetts where Thoreau once lived and after which his book is named
 Walden Ponds Wildlife Habitat, Boulder County, Colorado (not to be confused with Walden Pond)

Place names 
 In Antarctica
 Cape Walden, an ice-covered cape at the northwest termination of Evans Peninsula
 In Canada
 Walden, Ontario, now part of the city of Greater Sudbury
 Walden, Calgary, a community in Calgary, Alberta
 In the United States
 Walden, Colorado
 Walden–Jackson County Airport
 Walden, Georgia
 Walden Township, Cass County, Minnesota
 Walden Township, Pope County, Minnesota
 Walden, New York
 Walden, Oregon
 Walden, Tennessee
 Walden, Texas
 Walden, Vermont
 Walden Galleria, a shopping mall in Buffalo, New York
 Walden Ridge (or Walden's Ridge), a mountain ridge and escarpment located in Tennessee
 In the United Kingdom
 King's Walden, a civil parish in Hertfordshire
 Little Walden, Essex
 RAF Little Walden (also known as Hadstock), a former World War II airfield in Essex
 Saffron Walden, Essex
 Walden Abbey, a former Benedictine monastery in Saffron Walden
 Saffron Walden (UK Parliament constituency)
 Saffron Walden Railway, a branch of the Great Eastern Railway
 St Paul's Walden, a village and civil parish in Hertfordshire
 Walden, North Yorkshire
 Walden Head, North Yorkshire
 Walden Stubbs, North Yorkshire

Education
 Walden College, a fictitious, third-rate academic institution in the Doonesbury comics
 Walden School (disambiguation)
 Walden Seminary, original name of Philander Smith College, in Little Rock, Arkansas
 Walden University

Other uses
 Walden (name), a given name and surname, including a list of people with the name
 Walden, a game
 Walden (film) a 1969 avant-garde film by Lithuanian filmmaker Jonas Mekas
 Walden7, an apartment building located in Sant Just Desvern, Barcelona, Spain
 Walden Media, a film production company
 Waldenbooks, an American mall-based book store
 Walden Guitars, an acoustic guitar manufacturer based in Lilan, China
 Walden Motorsport, an Australian race car preparation outfit
 Walden Asset Management (WAM), an American ethical investment company founded in 1975
 Walden reductor, a metal reduction column filled with silver
 Amelia Elizabeth Walden Award, an American young adult literature annual award established in 2008

See also 
 Walden Two, a book by B.F. Skinner
 "My Walden", a song by Nightwish from Endless Forms Most Beautiful
 Wald (disambiguation)
 Walde
 Waldman
 Waldmann
 Waldner